Liselotte Kobi (born 15 February 1930) is a Swiss former swimmer. She competed at the 1948 Summer Olympics and the 1952 Summer Olympics.

References

External links
 

1930 births
Living people
Swiss female breaststroke swimmers
Olympic swimmers of Switzerland
Swimmers at the 1948 Summer Olympics
Swimmers at the 1952 Summer Olympics
People from Schaffhausen
Sportspeople from the canton of Schaffhausen
20th-century Swiss women